The Seychelle Islands treefrog or Seychelles treefrog (Tachycnemis seychellensis) is a species of frog in the family Hyperoliidae. It is endemic to Seychelles.  Its natural habitats are subtropical or tropical moist lowland forest, rivers, swamps, freshwater marshes, intermittent freshwater marshes, plantations, rural gardens, heavily degraded former forest, and irrigated land.

T. seychellensis is the only species in the genus Tachycnemis.

Currently, the granitic Seychelles are the remaining emergent part of a continental fragment, previously part of Gondwana, that was associated with India and Madagascar when they separated from Africa during the Cretaceous.

References

Tachycnemis
Amphibians of Seychelles
Monotypic amphibian genera
Endemic fauna of Seychelles
Amphibians described in 1841
Taxa named by André Marie Constant Duméril
Taxa named by Gabriel Bibron
Taxonomy articles created by Polbot